Theta Islands are several small islands and rocks which lie close west of Kappa Island at the west extremity of the Melchior Islands, Palmer Archipelago. The islands were roughly charted by Discovery Investigations personnel in 1927. The name, derived from the eighth letter of the Greek alphabet, appears to have been first used on a 1946 Argentine government chart following surveys of the Melchior Islands by Argentine expeditions in 1942 and 1943.

See also 
 List of Antarctic and sub-Antarctic islands

References 

Islands of the Palmer Archipelago